"En feu" is a song by French rapper Soprano released in 2016.

Chart performance

Weekly charts

References

2016 singles
French-language songs
2016 songs